The Bold Men is a 1965 documentary film directed by William Friedkin. It was the first of three documentaries Friedkin made for producer David Wolper.

See also
List of American films of 1965

References

Friedkin, William, The Friedkin Connection, HarperCollins 2013

External links
The Bold Men at David L Wolper website

Films directed by William Friedkin
American documentary television films
1965 television films
1965 documentary films
1960s American films